Spigelian fascia may refer to:
The combined ventral aponeuroses of the external abdominal oblique muscle, the internal abdominal oblique muscle and transversus abdominis muscle
Just the ventral aponeurosis of the transversus abdominis muscle